The Valle del Guadalhorce is a comarca in the province of Málaga, Andalusia, southern Spain. It includes 8 municipalities and is part of the natural region of the Guadalhorce river.

Coín is traditionally considered the most important town in the comarca.

Municipalities

References

External links
Rural group of Valle del Guadalhorce 

Comarcas of Andalusia
Natural regions of Spain